The Convention of Milan, signed on 13 March 1707 during the War of the Spanish Succession, was an agreement between France and Austria which ended the fighting in Northern Italy. The French were allowed to withdraw their remaining forces undisturbed and in return handed control of any towns they still held to the Austrian commander Prince Eugene of Savoy.

Background
Habsburg Spain had dominated Italy since the Peace of Cateau-Cambrésis in 1559; their possessions included the kingdoms of Sardinia, Naples and Sicily, along with a number of territories in the north, the most important being the Duchy of Milan. By 1700, this position was increasingly threatened by the general decline of Spanish power, Italian resentment over decades of heavy taxation to pay for their wars, and the rise of Savoy. 

When Charles II of Spain, last Habsburg ruler of the Spanish Empire, died in November 1700 without children, he left his throne to Philip of Anjou, younger grandson of Louis XIV of France, who became Philip V of Spain. In early 1701, French troops occupied Milan and Mantua on his behalf and Louis XIV made an alliance with Victor Amadeus of Savoy, whose daughter Maria Luisa married Philip. These actions led to the outbreak of the War of the Spanish Succession in July. 

Possession of these territories allowed the Franco-Spanish Bourbon alliance to threaten the Archduchy of Austria, heartland of the Habsburg monarchy. This led Emperor Leopold to despatch an Imperial army into Italy commanded by his best general, Prince Eugene of Savoy, who by February 1702 had regained control of most of Lombardy. However, the collapse of Imperial finances in 1703 and a Hungarian revolt forced Leopold to withdraw his troops and allowed the Franco-Spanish alliance to recover most of their losses. 

Although Victor Amadeus switched sides in October 1703, by the beginning of 1705 Savoy was close to defeat and Prince Eugene was sent back to Italy by Emperor Joseph, who had succeeded his father in May. Much of his army consisted of German mercenaries funded by England and the Dutch Republic. With their help, Prince Eugene broke the Siege of Turin in September, then seized Milan; despite a minor victory at Castiglione on 8 September, French forces in Italy were now cut off from France. In February 1707, Modena surrendered to Imperial forces, leaving Mantua as the only significant city still held by the Franco-Spanish alliance.

Provisions

The War of the Spanish Succession was fought in a number of linked but separate theatres, the most important being those in Northern Italy, the Low Countries and Spain, where the Allies were backing the claim of Archduke Charles, younger brother of Emperor Joseph. However, the Austrian Habsburgs viewed Italy as more important to their long-term security than Spain and it was their refusal to agree the cession of Naples, Sicily and Milan to France that led to the failure of the Treaty of London (1700) and the outbreak of war in 1701.

By 1706, the Bourbon alliance was under immense pressure both in Flanders, following a heavy defeat at Ramillies in July, and in Spain, where the Allies captured Madrid before being forced to retreat in October. Success in Northern Italy meant they now planned an attack on the French naval base at Toulon, in which Savoyard and Imperial land forces would be supported by the Royal Navy. Its capture would confirm Allied naval supremacy in the western Mediterranean Sea, allow them to support the Protestant Camisard revolt in Southern France, divert Bourbon forces from Spain, and regain the French-occupied Savoyard territories of Villefranche and the County of Savoy.   

Having decided to cut his losses in Italy, Louis opened negotiations with Emperor Joseph, using the Prince de Vaudémont, last Spanish Governor of Milan and Governor-General of Lombardy. From his base in Mantua, during the winter of 1706/1707 Vaudémont began secret talks with Prince Eugene to withdraw all remaining Bourbon forces from Italy for use elsewhere. On 13 March 1707, they signed the Convention of Milan, which allowed all remaining Franco-Spanish troops free passage into France; in return, Vaudémont ceded the Spanish Duchies of Milan and Mantua to Austria.

Aftermath
Although the Convention ensured Austrian domination of Italy with minimal expense and thus made strategic sense for Emperor Joseph, his Allies reacted with fury. The English and Dutch had largely financed Prince Eugene's army while Victor Amadeus had expected to gain Milan but it also allowed France to withdraw nearly 30,000 troops for use elsewhere. Many of those evacuated from Lombardy played a key role in defeating the Allied attack on Toulon in August 1707, which Marlborough considered a serious strategic defeat. It ended hopes of attacking France through its vulnerable southern border, forcing the Allies into a war of attrition on their strongly held northern frontier.

References

Sources
 
 
 
 
 
 
 
 
 
 
 

1700s in law
Treaties
War of the Spanish Succession
1707 in France
1707 in Italy
1707 in Spain
1707 in the Habsburg monarchy
Milan 1707
Milan 1707
Milan 1707